The 2018–19 Principality Premiership was the third season of the new format of the Principality Premiership, the top tier of club rugby in Wales run by the Welsh Rugby Union. It was contested by sixteen Welsh clubs following an expansion from twelve teams at the start of the 2016–17 season. The 2018–19 season saw the end of "ring-fencing" and relegation returned for this season with four teams being automatically relegated to the 2019–20 WRU Championship and a fifth team avoiding relegation by winning a play-off. The competition was won by Merthyr for the third consecutive year.

Structure 
The structure this year has reverted to a traditional league. Each team will play each other team on a home and away basis for a total of 30 games. League points are awarded as such – 4 points for a win, 2 for a draw and 0 for a loss. Teams can also earn an additional bonus point by scoring four or more tries in a match and/or losing by less than seven points. This season sees the return of relegation from the Premiership after two seasons of ring fencing. The bottom four sides will automatically be relegated to the Championship for the 2019–20 season. The 12th placed side will play-off against the winners of the 2018–19 WRU Championship at a neutral venue to determine the 12th team in next season's Premiership. If the winners of the Championship do not have an 'A License' necessary to compete in the Premiership, then the 12th placed team will remain in the Premiership for next season.

Teams 
The same 16 teams that competed the previous season competed again this season. Merthyr are the reigning champions and are aiming to win the league for the third year in succession.

Standings

Promotion/relegation play-off 
The 12th placed team of the Premiership (Llanelli) faced the winner of the Championship (Pontypool) to determine who will be in next season's Premiership. The play-off was a one-off game played at a neutral venue. The venue was announced as Aberavon's home ground the Tablbot Athletic Ground on 7 May 2019. Llanelli won the game and would therefore remain in the Premiership for the 2019–20 season. Pontypool would contest the Championship for the 2019–20 season

References

External links 
 

Welsh Premier Division seasons
2018–19 in Welsh rugby union
Wales